The Airports Security Force (ASF) is a federal agency under the administrative control of the Secretary to the Government of Pakistan for Aviation which is responsible for protecting the airports, facilities and the planes (on-ground or in-air) in Pakistan. ASF safeguards the civil aviation industry against unlawful interferences, adopting counter terrorism measures, preventing crime and maintaining law and order within the limits of airports in Pakistan. The current Director General of ASF is Major General Adnan Asif Jah Shad HI(M). The ASF is an 8,945-personnel organisation.

History 
The ASF was established in 1976 under the Airports Security Force Act LXXVII of 1975 initially as the Directorate of the Department of Civil Aviation. After the hijacking of a Pakistan International Airlines aeroplane in March 1981, sensing the contradictory requirements of security and facilitation, the Airports Security Force (ASF) was separated, and in December 1983, was placed under the folds of the Ministry of Defence.

Later, in 2013 under the umbrella of Cabinet Secretariat, an Aviation Division was created and Airports Security Force (ASF), Pakistan Civil Aviation Authority (CAA) and Pakistan International Airlines (PIA) came under the control of new division. The Aviation Division is headed by the Aviation Secretary of Pakistan. The ASF is mainly responsible for security of airports and aircraft.

Subsidiaries
ASF Schools and Colleges
ASF Medical Centres
ASF Land and Housing
ASF Security Pvt Ltd

Directors General (Former Force Commanders)
Since inception, ASF has always been headed by officers of Pakistan Armed Forces. Currently Major General ranked officers of Pakistan army heads organization for a term of three years.

See also 
 Law enforcement in Pakistan

References

External links 
 ASF - Official website: www.asf.gov.pk
Join ASF - Official website: www.joinasf.gov.pk
 Official Facebook page
 Download ASF Roll No Slip

1976 establishments in Pakistan
Government agencies established in 1976

Federal law enforcement agencies of Pakistan